Daniel "Danny" Ryan (1 May 1870 – 31 December 1966) was an Irish hurler who played as a forward for the Tipperary senior team.

Ryan lined out for the team for just one season during the inaugural 1887 championship. He enjoyed much success that year, winning an All-Ireland medal as Tipp claimed the very first championship title.

At club level Ryan played with Moycarkey–Borris.

References

1870 births
1966 deaths
Moycarkey-Borris hurlers
Tipperary inter-county hurlers
All-Ireland Senior Hurling Championship winners